Hypericum ascyron, the great St. Johnswort or giant St. John's wort is a flowering plant in the family Hypericaceae.

Description
This large species of Hypericum grows to be 3–5 feet tall. It is perennial and its leaves are a deep green, elliptic, and grow up to five inches long. Its flowers have five petals and it can have thirteen or more stamens.

Taxonomy
Accepted infraspecifics include:
 Hypericum ascyron subsp. ascyron
 Hypericum ascyron subsp. gebleri
 Hypericum ascyron subsp. pyramidatum

Distribution
It is found Asia and North America, in the latter primarily in the American Midwest, as well as parts of New England and Quebec. It occurs in Russia, Mongolia, Korea, Taiwan, China, Vietnam, Canada, and the United States.

References

ascyron
Flora of North America